Busot is a municipality in the comarca of Alacantí in the Valencian Community, Spain.

The moros i cristians festivals are held from the Friday to the Monday on the weekend after Easter weekend every year.

Canelobre Cave is found in Busot. Considered the highest cave in spain, and one of the largest at just over 80,000 cubic meters in volume, this is an experience not to be missed, even the view looking  down the valley toward the costal town of “El Campello” is worth the trip. Access is well signed from Busot village. The caves or “cuevas” were used during the spanish civil war for building and repair of vital aircraft engines for a brief 5 year period in the 1930’s. the caves were then opened to the public in 1965. 

Latitude:38.5098047,| Length: -0.4140045

References

Municipalities in the Province of Alicante
Alacantí